Burning Shed is an independent record label established in April 2001 by musicians Tim Bowness and Pete Morgan.

The label was envisaged as an artistically focused, online extension of labels such as 4AD, Factory, ECM, DGM and Mute.

Burning Shed hosts the official online shops for Porcupine Tree, Lo-Fi Resistance, No-Man, OSI, Medium (Jansen, Barbieri and Karn), 21st Century Schizoid Band, Rothko, Roger Eno, Hugh Hopper, Stewart/Gaskin and Hatfield and the North.

Since March 2008, Burning Shed has become the official online distributor for Peaceville Records and the new post-progressive imprint Kscope (both Snapper Music divisions).

More recently, Burning Shed has become the host of official stores for Andy Partridge, King Crimson,  Thomas Dolby,  DGMLive, Bill Bruford, Jethro Tull and others.

See also
 List of record labels

References

External links
 Burning Shed Records
 Peaceville Records at Burning Shed
 Noisebox site

British independent record labels
Record labels established in 2001
Progressive rock record labels
Ambient music record labels
Electronic music record labels
Alternative rock record labels